These page shows the results of the III Beach volleyball World Championships, held from August 1 to August 4, 2001, in Klagenfurt, Austria. It was the third official edition of this event, after ten unofficial championships (1987–1996) all held in Rio de Janeiro, and the second to be organized in Europe.

Men's competition

Final ranking (top sixteen)
 A total number of 48 participating couples

Women's competition
 A total number of 47 participating couples

Final ranking (top sixteen)

References
 Beach Volleyball Results

2001
W
B
International volleyball competitions hosted by Austria